The following is a list of episodes for the third season of Sunrise' anime television series, Aikatsu!, which aired on TV Tokyo between October 2, 2014 and September 24, 2015. This season focuses on Akari Ozora, a first year at Starlight Academy who seeks to become a top idol like her upperclassman, Ichigo Hoshimiya. For episodes 102-126, the opening theme is "Du-Du-Wa DO IT!!" by Ruka, Mona, and Miki from AIKATSU☆STARS! with Waka from STAR☆ANIS and the ending theme is "Good morning my dream", also performed by Ruka, Mona, and Miki from AIKATSU☆STARS! From episode 127 onwards, the opening theme is "Lovely Party Collection" by Ruka, Mona, and Miki from AIKATSU☆STARS!

Episodes

References

2014 Japanese television seasons
Aikatsu!
Aikatsu! episode lists